Bravin is a surname. Notable people with the surname include:

Adam Bravin, American musician and producer
Jess Bravin (born 1965), American journalist
Leandro Henrique de Oliveira Bravin (born 1986), Brazilian footballer
Nick Bravin (born 1971), American Olympic fencer and lawyer